

Storms
Note:  indicates the name was retired after that usage in the respective basin.

 Xangsane
 2000 – a Category 2 typhoon that struck Luzon and Taiwan, killing 181 people, mostly related to the crash of Singapore Airlines Flight 006; also known as Reming in the Philippine Area of Responsibility (PAR).
 2006 – a Category 4 typhoon that affected the Philippines, Vietnam, and Thailand also known as Milenyo in the PAR.

 Xaver (2013) – a European windstorm that killed 15 people.

 Xavier
 1992 – short-lived tropical storm far off the coast of southwestern Mexico.
 2006 – a Category 4 tropical cyclone that formed to the north of the Santa Cruz Islands in the South Pacific Ocean.
 2017 – a European windstorm that affected Northern Europe.
 2018 – a tropical storm that brushed southwestern Mexico.

 Xina (1985) – a looping Category 3 hurricane far off the southwest coast of Mexico.

See also

European windstorm names
Atlantic hurricane season
List of Pacific hurricane seasons
Tropical cyclone naming
South Atlantic tropical cyclone
Tropical cyclone

References

X